Kozino is a rural locality (a village) in Sosnovskoye Rural Settlement, Vologodsky District, Vologda Oblast, Russia. The population was 13 as of 2002.

Geography 
Kozino is located 8 km southeast of Vologda (the district's administrative centre) by road. Yarilovo is the nearest rural locality.

References 

Rural localities in Vologodsky District